The following is a list of highest-grossing sports films of all time, the highest-grossing sports film franchises and series, the highest-grossing films by sport, the highest-grossing sports films by year, timeline of highest-grossing sports films, and sports films by tickets sold.

Highest-grossing sports films
The following is a list of highest-grossing sports films of all time. 
Motor racing is the most frequent sport with 18 films on the list. Fast & Furious is the most frequent franchise with nine films, followed by Rocky with eight. The most frequent year is 2006, which has four films on the list.

Highest-grossing sports film series and film franchises
The following is a list of highest-grossing sports film series and film franchises of all time. Motor racing is the most frequent sport represented, with six franchises on the list.

{| cellpadding="0" cellspacing="1" style="border:1px solid darkgrey; margin:auto; width:85em;"
|+ Highest-grossing sports film franchises and film series
|+ 
|-
| colspan="6" |

|-
| colspan="6" |

|-
| colspan="6" |

|-
|colspan="6"|

|-
| colspan="6" |

|-
| colspan="6" |

|-
| colspan="6" |
{{Highest-grossing films franchise|rank=6|title=The Karate Kid|number=5|highest=The Karate Kid|gross=359126022

|The Karate Kid (2010)
|359126022
|The Karate Kid (1985) to The Karate Kid Part III (1989)
|300442786
|The Next Karate Kid (1994)|16014777
}}
|-
|colspan="6"|

|-
| colspan="6" |

|-
| colspan="6" |

|-
| colspan="6" |

|-
| colspan="6" |

|-
| colspan="6" |

|-
| colspan="6" |

|-
| colspan="6" |

|-
| colspan="6" |

|-
| colspan="6" |

|-
| colspan="6" |

|-
| colspan="6" |

|-
| colspan="6" |

|-
| colspan="6" |

|-
| colspan="6" |

|-
| colspan="6" |

|-
| colspan="6" |

|-
| colspan="6" |

|-
| colspan="6" |

|}

Highest-grossing films by sport

The following is a list of highest-grossing films by sport. Note that some films feature more than one sport so they could be on the list more than once.

Highest-grossing sports films by year

The following is a list of highest-grossing sports films by year. Motor racing is the most frequent sport with 21 films on the list, with The Fast & Furious series claiming more entries (eight) than any other franchise. For films with two totals listed (with one in parentheses), the first indicates its total gross over all releases, while the second indicates the gross for its initial release.

 

 
 

Timeline of highest-grossing sports films
The following is a timeline of the highest-grossing sports films of all time. At least eight films have held the title, with Enter the Dragon claiming the longest reign. It is one of two martial arts films starring Bruce Lee to have held the title. Motor racing is the most frequent sport on the list with three films.

 

Highest-grossing opening weekends for sports films
The following is a list of biggest opening for sports films of all time. 
Films that played since 1985 are on the list, 2013 is the most represented on the list with 5 films.Fast & Furious is the franchise with the most films on the list with 6 films, while motor racing has the most of any sport with 13 films.

 

Timeline of highest-grossing openings
The following is a timeline of the biggest worldwide opening for a sports film of all time. Boxing is the most represented sport with four films on the list, three of which are part of the Rocky franchise.

Highest opening weekends by sport
 
The following is a list of highest-grossing opening weekends for sports films by sport. Films featuring more than one sport may appear on the list more than once.

Sports films by tickets sold

The following is a list of sports films that have sold more than  tickets worldwide. The Fast & Furious'' franchise has the most entries with six films on the list. Motor racing is the sport with the most entries, with thirteen films.

See also
 Sports film
 List of sports films
 List of highest-grossing films
 Lists of highest-grossing films

Notes

References

Sports
Lists of sports films